Harmony Heights Residential and Day School is a therapeutic school for girls diagnosed with emotional issues in East Norwich, New York. 

Harmony Heights is a New York Department of Education-approved program and offers a New York State Regents diploma program in a therapeutic special educational setting. Founded in 1974, Harmony has assisted thousands of girls throughout the New York Metropolitan area (including Long Island, Brooklyn, Queens, Manhattan, the Bronx, Staten Island, Westchester County, and Upstate New York) in getting the help they need to heal and recover from serious emotional problems (such as severe anxiety, depression, trauma, and PTSD) that have interfered with or prevented them from benefiting from or attending traditional public schools. Harmony provides therapeutic and educational support systems, which include small class sizes; one-on-one, group, and family counseling; parent supports; Equine and Garden therapies, and Therapy Dogs. Harmony has rolling admission and students may transfer in at any time of year.

The school was formerly the Mabel G. Fox School.

Harmony Heights School has 75 students, ages 13 to 21, diagnosed with emotional difficulties.

Tuition is regularly paid for by the school district where the student lives. 

Harmony Heights School has a residential program. Students enroll in either the day program or the residential program.

References

External links
 Official site

Boarding schools in New York (state)
Girls' schools in New York (state)
Schools in Nassau County, New York
Behavior modification
Special schools in the United States
Special education in the United States
Educational institutions established in 1974
1974 establishments in New York (state)
Girls boarding schools